Melbourne Girls' College (MGC) is an all-girl public school located on Yarra Boulevard in the Melbourne suburb of Richmond. It has one campus on the banks of the Yarra River which caters for girls from years 7 to 12, (11/12 VCE/VCE VET) and has an enrolment of 1465, with a division between the middle and senior school. Currently, girls from 212 Melbourne postcodes, in Melbourne and country Victoria, along with girls from overseas countries, make up the student population. Sixty countries of birth are represented at the school.

History

Melbourne Girls' College was established in January 1994 with an enrolment of approximately 300 students. The college used the buildings of the former Richmond Secondary College, which had been closed in 1992 by the Kennett government.

Although the college was established as an entirely new school, with a unique identity and mission, many of the founding staff and the initial intake of students, came from three other schools which had been closed by the Kennett government: Richmond Girls' High School, Malvern Girls' High School, and Richmond Secondary College.

The founding principal was Cavell Zangalis, previously the principal of Richmond Girls' High School. The school was founded on the former site of Richmond Secondary College. From 1995, Jan Parkes led the college for over seven years, developing it into an innovative educational institution. In 2002, a new principal, Judy Crowe, made changes to the curriculum structure and oversaw the development of several new facilities. The current principal, Karen Money, joined the college in 2015.

In 2016, Melbourne Girls’ College initiated a S.T.E.A.M program. This program is designed to promote Science, Technologies, Engineering, The Arts and Mathematics across the school and as a career pathway.

Extracurricular programs run by the college include Australian Airforce Cadets, aerobics, environment, instrumental music, dance and a Confucius Classroom.

In 2020, Melbourne Girls' College was ranked ninth out of all state secondary schools in Victoria, based on VCE results.

References

External links
Melbourne Girls' College Home page

Girls' schools in Victoria (Australia)
Educational institutions established in 1994
Public high schools in Melbourne
1994 establishments in Australia
Alliance of Girls' Schools Australasia
Buildings and structures in the City of Yarra